is a Japanese professional footballer who plays as an attacking midfielder for Bundesliga club VfB Stuttgart and the Japan national team.

Club career

Urawa Red Diamonds
Haraguchi made his debut as a professional on 25 May 2008, in the J. League Cup match against Nagoya Grampus. He scored his first professional goal against Nagoya Grampus in a J. League Division 1 game on 12 April 2009.

Hertha BSC
On 25 May 2014, it was announced that Haraguchi had been signed by Hertha BSC. He scored his first competitive goal for Hertha on 16 August 2014 in a 4–2 win during the first round DFB Pokal game against FC Viktoria Köln. He scored his first Bundesliga goal on 14 March against Schalke 04 to put Hertha 2–1 in front.

In January 2018, Haraguchi joined Fortuna Düsseldorf on loan until the end of the season.

Fortuna Düsseldorf (loan)
While on loan at Düsseldorf for the 2017–18 season, Haraguchi played a key role in helping the side gain promotion to the Bundesliga.

Hannover 96
On 11 June 2018, Haraguchi announced that he had reached an agreement to join Hannover 96 for the 2018–19 season.

VfB Stuttgart
On 30 January 2023, Haraguchi signed for VfB Stuttgart on an eighteen-month contract.

International career

2011 AFC Asian Cup
Haraguchi was elected as one of the preliminary registration members on Japan's 50-man list.

2013 EAFF East Asian Cup
Haraguchi played for Japan in the 2013 EAFF East Asian Cup. He played against China PR and South Korea for 71 and 90 minutes respectively, and helped Japan to win the championship for the first time.

2018 World Cup
In May 2018 Haraguchi was named to Japan's preliminary squad for the 2018 FIFA World Cup in Russia.

Career statistics

Club

International

Scores and results list Japan's goal tally first, score column indicates score after each Haraguchi goal.

Honours
Fortuna Düsseldorf
2. Bundesliga: 2017–18

Japan
AFC Asian Cup runner-up: 2019
EAFF East Asian Cup: 2013

Individual
 J. League Cup New Hero Award: 2011

References

External links

Genki Haraguchi at Urawa Reds official site 
Genki Haraguchi  at Yahoo! Japan sports 

1991 births
Living people
Association football wingers
Japanese footballers
Association football people from Saitama Prefecture
Japan youth international footballers
Japan international footballers
2018 FIFA World Cup players
2019 AFC Asian Cup players
J1 League players
Bundesliga players
2. Bundesliga players
Urawa Red Diamonds players
Hertha BSC players
Fortuna Düsseldorf players
Hannover 96 players
1. FC Union Berlin players
VfB Stuttgart players
Japanese expatriate footballers
Expatriate footballers in Germany
Japanese expatriate sportspeople in Germany